A garden building is a structure built in a garden or backyard.  

Such structures include:

 cabanas
 follies
 garden offices
 gazeboes
 gloriette
 greenhouses
 nymphaea
 orangeries
 pavilions
 pergolas
 Scandinavian grillhouses
 sheds
 sylvan theater

Garden features